Delfi-n3Xt is a Dutch nanosatellite which is operated by Delft University of Technology. It was launched on 21 November 2013. It is a three-unit CubeSat which will be used to demonstrate propulsion and communications systems for future missions.

Delfi-n3Xt was launched successfully by a Dnepr carrier rocket flying from Site 370/13 at the Dombarovsky launch site. Delfi was a secondary payload aboard the rocket, whose primary mission was to deploy DubaiSat 2 and STSAT-3. Delfi was one of 25 secondary payloads aboard the rocket, for a total of 32 satellites.

The Delfi team made contact with the satellite during its first pass.

References

Student satellites
Spacecraft launched in 2013
CubeSats
Satellites of the Netherlands
Science and technology in the Netherlands
Spacecraft launched by Dnepr rockets